Örnekköy is a village in the Yüksekova District of Hakkâri Province in Turkey. The village had a population of 398 in 2022.

Population 
Population history from 2000 to 2022:

References

Further reading 

 

Villages in Yüksekova District
Kurdish settlements in Hakkâri Province